Pixela Corporation is a Japanese manufacturer of PC peripheral hardware and multimedia software. The company is known for its software series, ImageMixer, which is currently bundled with some camcorders. Pixela is also famous for manufacturing 1seg Tuners in Japan. The company was founded June 21, 1982 and employs 266 people. The current CEO is Hiroshi Fujioka who is also a founding member Pixela Corporation. The company headquarters are in Osaka, Japan.

Subsidiaries
Pixela owns subsidiaries in Japan and North America, such as Synthesis, Prodia, RfStream, and Pialex Technologies. These subsidiaries mainly produce microchips and video capture board.

Pixela Shop
Pixela has an online shop, which sells ImageMixer series, other software, and some hardware. Also, the company operates the supporting website ImageMixer.

See also
 ImageMixer
 List of Japanese companies

References

External links
 Pixela Corporation. Official Website

Electronics companies established in 1982
Film and video technology
Graphics hardware companies
Electronics companies of Japan
Software companies of Japan
Companies based in Osaka Prefecture
Japanese companies established in 1982
Japanese brands
Companies listed on the Tokyo Stock Exchange